Love Destiny may refer to:

 "Love Destiny" (song), a 2001 song by Yui Horie
 "Love (Destiny)", a 1999 song by J-pop singer Ayumi Hamasaki
 Love: Destiny, a 2001 EP by the group Destiny's Child
 Mathew Knowles & Music World Present Vol.1: Love Destiny, a 2008 compilation album by Destiny's Child
 Love Destiny (TV series), a 2018 Thai TV series

See also
Love and Destiny (Chinese: 宸汐缘; pinyin: Chen Xi Yuan), a 2019 Chinese television series